Banggi Island is located within the Kudat Division of Sabah in Malaysia. With an area of 440.7 square kilometres, it is the largest island in Malaysia followed by Bruit Island, Langkawi Island and Penang Island. It is located off the northern coast of Sabah near Marudu Bay. The highest elevation on the island is Bukit Sinambung with height of 529 metres. As of 2016, it has an estimated population of 30,000. Banggi's largest settlement is Limbuak. In 2014, a new township was proposed to be built in the island. The island is also part of the gazetted area of Tun Mustapha Marine Park.

The main ethnicities in Banggi Island are Ubian and Dusun Bonggi, but there are others such as Suluk, Balabak, and other minority. The main spoken mother tongue language is Ubian, with the official language Malaysian well understood by all.

District Office Banggi Island covers Balambangan Island, Tanjung Manawali Island, and Tigabu Island.

Socioeconomy activities are mainly fishery. However, it does have palm oil, rubber and coconut plantation.

The nearest neighbouring Philippine island is Mangsee Islands.

See also
 List of islands of Malaysia

References

External links
 UN Systemwide Earthwatch

Islands of Sabah